Harold Eustace Sexton (14 May 1888 – 29 March 1972) was an eminent Anglican bishop in the mid-20th century.

He was educated at St Peter's College, Adelaide and Keble College, Oxford and ordained in 1912. After curacies at St Paul's, Port Adelaide and All Saints, Hindmarsh he was a Chaplain with the BEF during the First World War. From 1920 he held incumbencies at St Martin's, Hawksburn and All Saints, Upper Norwood before being appointed Bishop Coadjutor of British Columbia in 1935. A year later he became the diocesan bishop, and in 1952 Archbishop of British Columbia. He relinquished both posts in 1969 and died three years later.

References

1888 births
People educated at St Peter's College, Adelaide
Alumni of Keble College, Oxford
Anglican bishops of British Columbia
20th-century Anglican Church of Canada bishops
Metropolitans of British Columbia
20th-century Anglican archbishops
1972 deaths
World War I chaplains
Royal Army Chaplains' Department officers